The Alliance for Rural Concerns is a party-list in the Philippines. In the 14 May 2007 election, the party won 1 seat in the nationwide party-list vote.

Electoral performance

Representatives to Congress
14th Congress of the Philippines:
Oscar D. Francisco
Narciso D. Santiago III

References

Party-lists represented in the House of Representatives of the Philippines